AWDF can refer to:
 African Wildlife Defence Force
 African Women's Development Fund